Litvinenko is a British 4-part television mini-series made for ITVX by Tiger Aspect, starring David Tennant in the role of Alexander Litvinenko, Margarita Levieva as Marina Litvinenko, directed by Jim Field Smith, and written by George Kay. The series premiered on 15 December 2022.

Synopsis
A dramatisation of the 10-year fight of Marina Litvinenko and the London police force as they work to prove the guilt and release the names of those responsible for the 2006 poisoning of Alexander Litvinenko.

Cast
 David Tennant as Alexander Litvinenko
 Margarita Levieva as Marina Litvinenko
  Mark Bonnar as Detective Superintendent Clive Timmons, Metropolitan Police
 Neil Maskell as Detective Inspector Brent Hyatt, Metropolitan Police
 Stephen Campbell Moore as Ben Emmerson, KC
 Simon Paisley Day as Sir John Scarlett
 Daniel Ryan as DAC Peter Clarke, Metropolitan Police
 Barry Sloane as Detective Sergeant Jim Dawson, Metropolitan Police
 Sam Troughton as Detective Inspector Brian Tarpey, Metropolitan Police
 Kirsten Foster as Jenny Hyatt, wife of Brian Hyatt
 Rad Kaim as Andrey Lugovoy
 Simon Haines as Dr Benjamin Swift
 Maggie Evans at Professor Pat Troop
 Nikolai Tsankov as Boris Berezovsky
 Sam Marks as Detective Constable Oliver Gadney, Metropolitan Police
 Mark Ivanir as Alexender Goldfarb
 Zoe Telford as Ingrid Campbell
 Joanna Kanska as Nika Privalova
 Selina Cadell as Louise Christiansen

Production
In September 2021 it was announced that Tennant and Margarita Levieva were to take on the roles of Alexander and Marina Litvinenko for ITV and Nordic Entertainment Group from a script from George Kay, with Tiger Aspect also producing. Jim Field Smith was announced as director with Neil Maskell and Mark Bonnar appearing as the police officers who interviewed Litvinenko in his hospital bed. Tennant met with Marina Litvinenko and said he felt a responsibility to her, saying, “it’s so relevant to the world we live in what happened to that man and the things that he spent his life talking about and that his wife Marina, who is an extraordinary human, is still doing. The reason we tell that story is because it’s so raw and vivid and important.” Filming took place in London from
October 2021.

To air in conjunction with the series, ITV commissioned Firecracker Films to produce an hour-long film detailing the events of the Polonium-210 poisoning of Litvinenko in 2006, including an interview with Marina Litvinenko, Assistant Commissioner for the Metropolitan Police Andy Hayman and James Cairns, who was the Police Radiation Protection Advisor.

Reception

Broadcast
In March 2022 the project was announced to be included in the productions set to be launched in the UK on the new for 2022 ITV streaming service ITVX. In October 2022, it was announced the project had also been sold internationally to more than 80 international markets, including Seven Network in Australia, Stockholm based Viaplay and their streaming service in the Nordics, Netherlands, Poland and the Baltics, and TVNZ in New Zealand, with AMC+ having exclusive rights in the US, and Amazon Prime Video in Canada. The series premiered on ITVX on 15 December 2022.

References

External links
 

Alexander Litvinenko
Television shows filmed in the United Kingdom
Television shows filmed in England
Television shows set in London
English-language television shows
Espionage television series
2022 British television series debuts
2022 British television series endings
2020s British drama television series
ITV television dramas
2020s British television miniseries
Television series by ITV Studios
Television series by Tiger Aspect Productions